Dehak (also Romanized as Dahak) is a village in Manzariyeh Rural District, in the Central District of Shahreza County, Isfahan Province, Iran. At the 2006 census, its population was 157, in 54 families.

References 

Populated places in Shahreza County